Yan Barthelemy Varela (born March 5, 1980, Matanzas) is a Cuban-American  amateur boxer, who won the gold medal in the light flyweight division (– 48 kg) at the 2004 Summer Olympics.

Amateur career
2004 Summer Olympics in Athens, Greece
Round of 32 – Defeated Miguel Ángel Miranda of Venezuela – RSC-3
Round of 16 – Defeated Suban Pannon of Thailand – PTS (23-14)
Quarterfinals – Defeated Hong Moo-Won of North Korea – PTS (30-11)
Semifinals – Defeated Zou Shiming of China – PTS (29-17)
Final – Defeated Atagun Yalcinkaya of Turkey – PTS (21-16)
2005 Boxing World Cup in Moscow, Russia
Defeated Suban Pannon (Thailand) 36–12
Defeated Iulius Poczo (Romania) RSC-2
Defeated Mirat Sarsembayev (Kazakhstan) 44–15
Defeated Sergey Kazakov (Russia) 26–14

In December 2006, Barthelemy together with fellow Athens Olympic champions Yuriorkis Gamboa Toledano and Odlanier Solís left training camp in Venezuela for Colombia and defected to the United States. They signed a contract with a Hamburg-based promoter and turned professional.

He was part of the Cuban team that won the 2006 Boxing World Cup.

Professional career
Barthelemy made his pro debut on April 27, 2007, by winning a UD against Ravil Mukhamadiarov and knocked him down in the 4th round. Bartelemí was 6-0 before being upset by unheralded Ernie Marquez, suffering his 1st loss. Bartelemí then went to win the vacant WBC Latino Bantamweight title in his next match. He most recently was upset by Jorge Diaz after taking the fight on short notice, losing by TKO, a major career setback.

References

External links
 Amateur record
 
 Yan Berthelemy, February 22, 2008 event
 

1980 births
Defecting sportspeople of Cuba
Light-flyweight boxers
Boxers at the 2003 Pan American Games
Boxers at the 2004 Summer Olympics
Olympic boxers of Cuba
Olympic gold medalists for Cuba
Living people
Olympic medalists in boxing
Medalists at the 2004 Summer Olympics
Cuban male boxers
AIBA World Boxing Championships medalists
Pan American Games gold medalists for Cuba
Pan American Games medalists in boxing
Central American and Caribbean Games bronze medalists for Cuba
Competitors at the 2006 Central American and Caribbean Games
Cuban emigrants to the United States
Central American and Caribbean Games medalists in boxing
Medalists at the 2003 Pan American Games